Rhamphomyia praestans is a species of dance flies, in the fly family Empididae. It is included in the subgenus Pararhamphomyia.

References

Rhamphomyia
Insects described in 1913
Asilomorph flies of Europe
Taxa named by Richard Karl Hjalmar Frey